The Cabinet of Abubakar Tafawa Balewa was the government of Nigeria, headed by Prime Minister Abubakar Tafawa Balewa, in the years leading up to and following independence. There were three cabinets. The first was established in 1957 when Balewa was appointed Prime Minister by the British Governor-General. The second was formed after the general elections of December 1959, just before independence, in a coalition government. The third was formed after the disputed general elections of December 1964, and was dissolved after the military coup of 15 January 1966.

First cabinet: 1957–59

On 30 August 1957 the Governor-General of Nigeria, Sir James Wilson Robertson, announced that Abubakar Tafawa Balewa had been appointed Prime Minister, with a broad-based National Government.
His first cabinet included ministers from all parties.
The cabinet was based on that appointed after the 1954 elections.
Cabinet ministers included:

Second cabinet: 1959–64

The next elections were held on 12 December 1959.
Results were Northern People's Congress (NPC): 134 seats; National Council of Nigeria and the Cameroons (NCNC) /  Northern Elements Progressive Union (NEPU): 89 seats; Action Group (AG): 73 seats; Other: 16 seats. 
The NPC and NCNC formed an alliance to create the new government, with Belewa again Prime Minister.
Nnamdi Azikiwe became ceremonial president.
Northerners were given the most important ministerial posts.
Balewa at first retained control of foreign policy, which was pro-western, and did not consult the cabinet.
The Balewa coalition of the NPC and NCNC held until 1964, when it broke up due to a dispute over leadership and ministerial appointments.
On 8 December 1964 parliament was officially dissolved.
Ministers in the second Balewa cabinet were:

Third cabinet: 1964–66

Before the general elections of December 1964 the United Progressive Grand Alliance  (UPGA), an alliance of the NCNC, AG, NEPU and United Middle Belt Congress (UMBC), complained that the campaign had not been free or fair. 
In the north, candidates had been intimidated and prevented from registering.
President Azikiwe tried to postpone the elections, but Balewa held them anyway.
Despite a partial boycott of the elections by the UPGA, the NNA alliance between the NPC and Nigerian National Democratic Party (NNDP), gained only a slim majority.
Azikiwe at first refused to ask Balewa to form a cabinet, but after a power struggle that lasted a few days he agreed on condition that Balewa's government be broad-based, and that fresh elections be held in the regions where the boycott had taken effect.
Balewa's government of national unity included members from both the winning and losing parties. 
There were 54 members in the cabinet from the NPC (22), NNDP (14), NCNC (15) as well as three independents.
This included 21 Cabinet Ministers, 11 Ministers of Cabinet Rank without Portfolio and 22 Ministers without Cabinet Rank.
Ministers with Portfolios were:

At midnight on 15 January 1966 five young army officers launched a coup. They killed Balewa and other leading politicians. The next day Acting President Orizu handed over power to Major-General Johnson Aguiyi-Ironsi.

Notes

Sources

Abubakar Tafawa Balewa